The P-3, (a.k.a. LIG-5 (Leningradskii Institoot Grazdahnskovo Vozdooshnovo Flota-  Leningrad Institute civil air fleet), was a multi-purpose trainer aircraft designed and built in the USSR from 1936.

Development 
In 1930 the LIIPS ( - Leningrad institute for sail and communications engineers) formed a UK GVF ( - training centre for civil air fleet), in turn the UK GVF formed the NIAI (Naoochno-Issledovatel'skiy Aero-Institoot - scientific test aero-institute) which became the focus of several good design engineers who were given command of individual OKB (Osboye Konstrooktorskoye Byuro – personal design/construction bureau).

The P-3 was designed by  Anatolii Georgievich Bedunkovich, an Engineer Colonel, was conceived as a more powerful and faster aircraft similar to the LK-4, able to be produced in several versions to carry out different tasks. The three variants tested were intended for military training of pilots and crewmen. Construction was of wood throughout with some fabric covering. Testing at Leningrad was successfully completed by February 1937 when the aircraft was transferred to NII VVS (Naoochno-Issledovatel'skiy Institoot Voyenno-Vozdooshnykh Seel – scientific test institute of the soviet air force), for further testing, a production order was anticipated but the prototype crashed irreparably, due to pilot error, and no production was authorised.

Variants 
 P-3DP – (Dvukmestnyi Polutoplan – two-seat sesquiplane) For training pilots and observers for R-5 and similar aircraft.
P-3OB – (Odnomestnyi Biplan – single-seat biplane) For training pilots of I-15 and other biplane fighters: The upper wing centre-section was removed along with the side cabane struts and the rear cockpit was faired over.
 P-3ON– (Odnomestnyi Nizkoplan – single-seat low-wing monoplane) For training I-16 and other monoplane fighter pilots, the P-3 ON had a cantilever lower wing only and a smaller tailplane.

Specifications (P-3DP)

See also

References

 Gunston, Bill. “The Osprey Encyclopaedia of Russian Aircraft 1875–1995”. London, Osprey. 1995. 

1930s Soviet civil trainer aircraft
NIAI aircraft
Aircraft first flown in 1934